Notacanthus is a genus of spiny eels in the family Notacanthidae.

Species
It currently contains these recognized species:

 Notacanthus abbotti Fowler, 1934  (Mindanao spiny eel)
 Notacanthus bonaparte A. Risso, 1840 (Shortfin spiny eel)
 Notacanthus chemnitzii Bloch, 1788 (Snub-nosed spiny eel)
 Notacanthus indicus Lloyd, 1909 (Arabian spiny eel)
 Notacanthus sexspinis J. Richardson, 1846 (Spiny-back eel)
 Notacanthus spinosus Garman, 1899 (Panama spiny-back eel)

References

 

Notacanthidae
Notacanthiformes